People in Sorrow is a 1969 album by the Art Ensemble of Chicago recorded in Boulogne for the French Pathé-Marconi label, later reissued in the US on Nessa Records. It features an extended improvised performance by Lester Bowie, Joseph Jarman, Roscoe Mitchell and Malachi Favors Maghostut.

Reception
The Allmusic review by Scott Yanow states "The still-startling music, which uses space, dynamics, and a wide range of emotions expertly, is not for everyone's taste (the high-energy tenors of the mid-1960s are actually easier to get into), but worth the struggle". The Rolling Stone Jazz Record Guide said "their masterpiece, People in Sorrow, a forty-minute example of how the group's menagerie of instruments and spontaneous approach to structure can create clearly delineated precisely shaded and starkly emotional music".

Track listing
 "People In Sorrow Part 1" - 17:05
 "People In Sorrow Part 2" - 23:05
All compositions by the Art Ensemble of Chicago
Recorded July 7, 1969 in Boulogne, Paris

Personnel
Lester Bowie: trumpet, percussion instruments
Malachi Favors Maghostut: bass, percussion instruments, vocals
Joseph Jarman: saxophones, clarinets, percussion instruments
Roscoe Mitchell: saxophones, clarinets, flute, percussion instruments

References

1969 albums
Pathé-Marconi albums
Art Ensemble of Chicago albums
Nessa Records albums